Oranienbaum is a Russian royal residence, located on the Gulf of Finland west of St. Petersburg. The Palace ensemble and the city centre are UNESCO World Heritage Sites.

History
In 1707, four years after Peter the Great founded Saint Petersburg, he gave the grounds near the seaside to his right-hand man, Aleksandr Danilovich Menshikov.

Menshikov commissioned the architects Giovanni Maria Fontana and Gottfried Schädel, who built his residence, the Grand Menshikov Palace from 1710 to 1727 (not to be confused with Menshikov Palace in Saint Petersburg, built by the same architects around the same time). The central part of the Palace is connected by two galleries with two domed Japanese and Church Pavilions. The Lower Garden, decorated with fountains and sculptures, and the Upper Garden were laid out at the same time. The Palace is located near the Lower Park, whose composite axis is a channel leading to the sea. This channel is an imitation of one designed by Peter himself at his nearby residence of Peterhof Palace.

Menshikov was deposed shortly after Peter's death, and died in exile, and the palace passed out of his family. In 1743, Oranienbaum became the summer residence of Grand Duke Peter Fedorovitch, the heir of Empress Elizabeth (the future Emperor Peter III). Over the last ten years of Elizabeth's reign, Bartolomeo Francesco Rastrelli reconstructed the Grand Palace, adding beauty to its decor.

From 1756 to 1762, the architect Antonio Rinaldi built the Peterstadt Fortress ensemble on the bank of the Karost River for Grand Duke Peter Fedorovitch. In 1762, Empress Catherine II ordered the construction of the suburb residence called "My Own Countryside House". For that purpose Rinaldi built the Chinese Palace (1762–1768), a mix of Baroque architecture, Classicism and Chinese motifs, the Katalnaya Gorka (roller coaster) Pavilion (1762–1774), a cupola pavilion, and the Gates of Honor with the tower crowned by a spire.

From the outside, the Chinese palace is a relatively simple building, single-storey except for the small central pavilion, painted in a mellow combination of ochre and yellow. The seventeen rooms inside, decorated by Rinaldi and other leading artists and craftsmen of the day, feature pink, blue and green scagliola, painted silks, and intricate stucco work. Rinaldi's parquet floors are wonderfully ornate, using several types of rare Russian and imported wood.

Among the highlights of the Chinese Palace interiors are the Glass Beaded Salon, the walls of which are hung with 12 panels of richly coloured tapestries depicting exotic birds and fauna. The fine white glass beads that form the backdrop of the tapestries give the whole room a diaphanous, shimmering quality that was designed to be particularly effective in the glowing twighlight of the White Nights. The full influence of Chinoiserie is in evidence in the Large Chinese Salon, where the walls are covered with marquetry paneling of wood and walrus ivory depicting oriental landscapes, and large Chinese lanterns hanging in the corners. The room also contains an English-made billiard table with superb wood carving.

The Upper Park was laid out from 1750 to 1770.

The palace was the site of two opera premieres to libretti by Metastasio in the middle of the eighteenth century, Amor prigioniero (one act, composed by Francesco Araia, 1755), and Semiramide riconosciuta (three acts, composed by Vincenzo Manfredini, 1760).

In the 19th century Oranienbaum became a noble manor. During World War II, Oranienbaum suffered to a much lesser extent than other suburbs of St. Petersburg, since defense was deployed here on the so-called “Oranienbaum Bridgehead”. However, the ensemble became desolate in the post-war period, and its serious restoration began only in the late 1990s. Restoration Of Oranienbaum has been a slow process. Tsarskoe Selo and Peterhof restorations were given higher priority, and that is one reason Oranienbaum is a less-visited attraction.

For the city which grew up around the palace see Lomonosov, Russia.

Sculptures of Oranienbaum

See also
 List of Baroque residences
 Lomonosov, Russia

References

External links

 Oranienbaum (Lomonosov) - History, details and visiting information
 

Houses completed in the 18th century
Palaces in Saint Petersburg
Gardens in Saint Petersburg
Royal residences in Russia
World Heritage Sites in Russia
Parks and open spaces in Saint Petersburg
Historic house museums in Saint Petersburg
Rococo architecture in Russia
Petergofsky Uyezd
Petrodvortsovy District
Cultural heritage monuments of federal significance in Saint Petersburg